Mentakab is a state constituency in Pahang, Malaysia. The current state assemblyman is Woo Chee Wan from DAP.

Demographics

Polling districts 
According to the federal gazette issued on 31 October 2022, the Mentakab constituency is divided into 12 polling districts.

Representation history

Election results

References

External links 
 https://undi.info/pahang/r18/n30
 

Pahang state constituencies